The Crusher is the third full-length studio album by Swedish death metal band Amon Amarth. It was released on 8 May 2001, through Metal Blade Records and Sony Music. The album was also released on the Double LP and Picture LP versions on 29 June 2007, which were hand-counted and limited to only 500 copies. A deluxe edition was released in 2009 that featured the album remastered by Jens Bogren, and a bonus CD of the original album played live in its entirety in Bochum, Germany.

Track listing

Personnel

Band members
 Fredrik Andersson – drums
 Olavi Mikkonen – lead guitar
 Johan Hegg – vocals
 Johan Söderberg – rhythm guitar
 Ted Lundström – bass guitar

Other
 Engineered by Lars Szöke and mixed by Peter Tägtgren
 Mastered at Cuttingroom by Peter In the Betou
 Bonus track "Eyes of Horror" recorded at Das Boot studio
 Cover by Tom Thiel and Thomas Everhard
 Layout by Thomas Everhard

Release history

References

Amon Amarth albums
Metal Blade Records albums
2001 albums